The 2000–01 Liga Leumit season saw Hapoel Be'er Sheva and Maccabi Kiryat Gat promoted to the Israeli Premier League, the latter for the first time in their history. Maccabi Ironi Kiryat Ata and Hapoel Jerusalem were relegated to Liga Artzit. Abed Titi of Maccabi Ahi Nazareth was the league's top scorer with 22 goals.

Following the first three rounds (33 games), the table was split into two, with teams from the "Upper group" and "Lower group" playing each other once more to make a total of 38 matches. The split meant that clubs in the bottom six could not finish above those in the top six, even though the four clubs finishing 7th-10th finished with more points that the 5th- and 6th-placed clubs.

Final table

External links
Israel Second Level 2000/01 RSSSF

Liga Leumit seasons
Israel
2000–01 in Israeli football leagues